Trophy is the fourth studio album by American country music artist Sunny Sweeney, released on March 10, 2017.

Reception
Chuck Dauphin of Sounds Like Nashville reviewed the album favorably, noting the mix of humor and introspection in Sweeney's song choices.

Track listing

Personnel
Adapted from liner notes.

Ray Benson – background vocals
Dave Brainard – acoustic guitar, percussion, keyboards, background vocals
Jim "Moose" Brown – piano
Jacob Clayton – fiddle, strings, dobro, cello, acoustic guitar
Tommy Detamore – steel guitar
Chris Donahue – bass guitar
Fred Eltringham – drums
Shelly Fairchild – background vocals
Keith Gattis – electric guitar
Kree Harrison – background vocals
James Hill – B-3 organ
Jack Ingram – background vocals
Joanna Janét – background vocals
Matt Menefee – banjo
James Mitchell – electric guitar
Mickey Raphael – harmonica
Sunny Sweeney – lead vocals
Sweepy Walker – harmonica
Trisha Yearwood – background vocals

Charts

References

2014 albums
Sunny Sweeney albums
Albums produced by Dave Brainard